The 1986 CFL Draft composed of eight rounds where 72 Canadian football players were chosen from eligible Canadian universities and Canadian players playing in the NCAA.

1st round

2nd round

3rd round
19. Calgary Stampeders                          Mike Torresan                  G                British Columbia

20. Saskatchewan Roughriders                    Dave McEachern                 DB               Princeton

21. Calgary Stampeders                          Dave Pappin                    LB               McMaster

22. Toronto Argonauts                           Mike Siroishka                 WR               Calgary

23. Ottawa Rough Riders                         Chuch Wust                     DB               Acadia

24. Edmonton Eskimos                            Greg McCormack                 DL               Simon Fraser

25. British Columbia Lions                      Ron Crick                      LB               Idaho State

26. Hamilton Tiger-Cats                         Greg Reynard  DL  Western Montana

27. British Columbia Lions                      Bob Skemp                       C                British Columbia, Richmond Raiders

4th round
28. Calgary Stampeders                          Steve Hudson                   T/G               Queen's

29. Ottawa Rough Riders                         Rob Taylor  DE/OL  Toronto

30. Saskatchewan Roughriders                    Tony Brown  K  San Jose State University

31. Ottawa Rough Riders                         Angus Donnelly  DE  Carleton

32. Montreal Concordes                          Peter Hess  TE/SB  Mount Allison

33. Edmonton Eskimos                            Michael Pauls                  TB/FB              Simon Fraser

34. Winnipeg Blue Bombers                       David Taylor  TE  Simon Fraser

35. Hamilton Tiger-Cats                         Rick Lococo                    C                  York

36. British Columbia Lions                      Scott Lecky                    WR                 Guelph

5th round

6th round
46. Calgary Stampeders                          Albert Calaguiro               TB  Concordia

47. Saskatchewan Roughriders                    Elio Geremia                   TB                 Calgary

48. Toronto Argonauts                           Bruce Elliot                   LB  Western Ontario

49. Ottawa Rough Riders                         Richard Storey                 DL                 McMaster

50. Montreal Concordes                          Dennis Touchette               DL  McGill

51. Edmonton Eskimos                            Darrelle Monzer                   DL                 Alberta

52. Winnipeg Blue Bombers                       Trevor Hollett                 DB  Manitoba

53. Hamilton Tiger-Cats                         Mike Jellema                   LB                 Simon Fraser

54. British Columbia Lions                      Floyd Mingo                    DB                 Simon Fraser

7th round

8th round
64. Calgary Stampeders                          John Smith  LB  Calgary

65. Saskatchewan Roughriders                    Calvin Sikorski  LB  Minot State

66. Toronto Argonauts                           Steve Del Zotto                 WR                    York

67. Ottawa Rough Riders                         Andre Van Vugt                 T                     Windsor

68. Montreal Concordes                          Vince Salazar                  CB                    Toronto

69. Edmonton Eskimos                            Gerald Telidetski              LB                    Alberta

70. Winnipeg Blue Bombers                       Jadrin Minaravic  K  St. Francis Xavier

71. Hamilton Tiger-Cats                         Paul Clatney                   DB                    McMaster

72. British Columbia Lions                      Steve Bernstein                DB                    Simon Fraser

References
Canadian Draft

Canadian College Draft
Cfl Draft, 1986